In mathematics, the Gauss map (also known as Gaussian map or mouse map), is a nonlinear iterated map of the reals into a real interval given by the Gaussian function:

 

where α and β are real parameters. 

Named after Johann Carl Friedrich Gauss, the function maps the bell shaped Gaussian function similar to the logistic map.

Properties
In the parameter real space  can be chaotic. The map is also called the mouse map because its bifurcation diagram resembles a mouse (see Figures).

References

Chaotic maps